Tomas Robert Ryde (born August 1960) is a Swedish handball coach who coaches the Romanian women's national team.

At the end of the 2007–08 season, he left Danish Viborg 'for family reasons' to return to Sweden. His assistant coach Jakob Vestergaard then took over as head coach after Ryde.

Ryde took over the position as head coach of the Romanian women's national team by mid-March 2015 after being previously eyed for Romania Women job in 2008.

On 4 October 2016, the Romanian Handball Federation (FRH) and Ryde have reached an agreement to terminate the employment contract by mutual agreement after 16 months. Ryde will now dedicate himself to a business career.

Coaching honours
Elitserien:
Winner: N/A
Swedish Cup:
Winner: N/A
Danish League:
Winner: 2006, 2008
Danish Cup:
Winner: 2007, 2008
Women's EHF Champions League:
Winner: 2006
EHF Women's Champions Trophy:
Winner: 2006
IHF World Women's Handball Championship:
Bronze medalist: 2015

Personal life
Tomas lives in Lidingö and has three children with his wife Marie. He's a former police officer.

References

1960 births
Living people
Swedish handball coaches
Swedish expatriate sportspeople in Denmark
Swedish expatriate sportspeople in Romania 
Handball coaches of international teams